Les Shadoks is an animated television series created by French cartoonist Jacques Rouxel (26 February 1931 – 25 April 2004) which caused a sensation in France when it was first broadcast in 1968–1974.

The Shadoks were bird-like in appearance (in the tradition of cartoon birds they had beaks with teeth), were characterised by ruthlessness and stupidity and inhabited a two dimensional planet. This planet was of irregular shape, which was continuously changing - causing major earthquakes - hence their desire to find a new home world.
There was a series of caves on the Shadok planet, known as the "Gulp" which was essentially a prison for undesirables.

One Shadok who stood apart from the others was the pirate - who was habitually drunk - and instead of the popular hobby of putting ships into bottles - he liked to put bottles into his ship.

Another set of creatures in the Shadok canon are the Gibis, who are the opposite to the Shadoks in that they are intelligent but vulnerable and also inhabit a two-dimensional planet. The Gibis were polite, always greeted each other formally, and kept their brains inside their bowler hats. The Gibi planet was a flat disc, finely balanced that if one Gibi went to one end of the planet; another would have to go to the far end to keep the planet balanced. Thus, the Gibis also wanted to find a new home world.

Ultimately, both saw the Earth as their ideal home - and both began to construct rockets to reach it.

The Shadoks were eventually able to leave their world thanks to the improved intelligence of one of their number; who happened to find a hat which one of the Gibis had lost.

Once both races reached Earth, much mayhem followed and they eventually realised it was not the ideal home they first thought.

Rouxel claims that the term Shadok obtains some derivation from Captain Haddock of Hergé's The Adventures of Tintin and the Gibis (who wear Bowler hats, which unlike their heads, contain their brains) are essentially GBs (Great Britons).

The Shadoks were a significant literary, cultural and philosophical phenomenon in France.

Even today, the French occasionally use satirical comparisons with the Shadoks for policies and attitudes that they consider absurd. The Shadoks were noted for mottos such as:
 "Why do it the easy way when you can do it the hard way?"
 "When one tries continuously, one ends up succeeding. Thus, the more one fails, the greater the chance that it will work."
 "If there is no solution, it is because there is no problem."
 "To reduce the numbers of unhappy people, always beat up the same individuals."
 "Every advantage has its disadvantages and vice versa."
 "If there is one chance out of a 1000 to succeed, rush failing the 999 first tries."

The Shadoks have four monosyllabic words in their language: "Ga", "Bu", "Zo", "Meu" (French spelling). But their brain have only four cells, so if they had to learn a new word (e.g. "Ni"), they would only remember the last four ones heard.

The Shadoks were also noted for their seemingly useless and endless pumping — as the Shadok say: "Better to pump even if nothing happens than to risk something worse happening by not pumping" and "When the Shadoks pumped, nothing happened; and the more they pumped, the more nothing happened."

In 1973, The Shadoks appeared on Thames Television, London's ITV company (later replaced by Carlton Television), in the early evening. Kenneth Robinson provided the narration in English. His narration to The Shadoks is very fondly remembered by those who heard it.

On 18 September 2007, Les Shadoks was shown on Gulli's flagship retro block, "Télégrenadine".

On April 29, 2016, four animated Google Doodles were shown on the Google.fr homepage for Les Shadok's 48th anniversary.

Filmography
 1968: Les Shadoks (first season)
 1969: French people write to the Shadoks.
 1970: Les Shadoks (second season)
 1974: Les Shadoks (third season)
 1999: Les Shadoks et le Big Blank (produced by Canal +, aaa and Cartoon Network Europe)

See also
 List of French animated television series
 ORTF
 Claude Piéplu

References

External links
 Les Shadoks.com
 Les Shadoks at the Internet Movie Database

1960s French animated television series
1970s French animated television series
1980s French animated television series
1990s French animated television series
2000s French animated television series
1968 French television series debuts
2009 French television series endings
French children's animated comic science fiction television series
Animated television series about extraterrestrial life
Television series set on fictional planets
Animated television series about birds